Entropia is Pain of Salvation's first studio album. It is a concept album concerning the story of a family in a fictional society that is torn apart by a war. The title is a portmanteau of Entropy (from thermodynamics, the measure of disorder present in a system), and Utopia (the ideal society). This is the only album to feature Daniel Magdic on guitar.

Release history
Entropia was first released by the Japanese company Marquee on their Avalon label in August 1997 (see 1997 in music). Following favourable reviews and positive fan reactions in the progressive rock/metal world, Marquee decided to fly Daniel over to Tokyo a week in October 1997 to promote the album. While in Tokyo, Daniel featured in various TV and radio shows, did interviews for the Japanese metal press, and performed in selected record stores. Around this time, purchasing albums through online record stores was commonplace, and fans from around the world began to do so with Entropia.

It was subsequently released in Romania (1998 on Rocris Discs), in Europe (September 1999 on InsideOut Music), in South America (September 1999 on Hellion), and in the USA (2000 on InsideOut America).

Concept

Track listing
All lyrics by Daniel Gildenlöw. All music by Daniel Gildenlöw except 1, 4 (part 2: "Memorials"), 6, 7 & 9 by Daniel Gildenlöw and Daniel Magdic.

Additional information
The Japanese version of "Entropia" has a bonus track after "To the End" titled "Never Learn to Fly".

Personnel
Daniel Gildenlöw - lead vocals, guitar
Kristoffer Gildenlöw - bass, vocals
Fredrik Hermansson - keyboards
Johan Langell - drums, vocals
Daniel Magdic - guitar, vocals

Additional personnel
Ander "Theo" Theander - Producer, engineering
Anders Hansson - Engineering

References

External links
PAIN OF SALVATION Entropia reviews and MP3 @ progarchives.com

1997 debut albums
Pain of Salvation albums
Concept albums